Barb Yarusso (born 1956) is a Minnesota politician and former member of the Minnesota House of Representatives. A member of the Minnesota Democratic–Farmer–Labor Party, she represented District 42A, which included portions of Ramsey County, Minnesota in the north-central Twin Cities metropolitan area.

Early life, education, and career
Yarusso grew up primarily in Columbia Heights, Minnesota, and graduated from Columbia Heights High School. She earned a Bachelor of Chemical Engineering from the University of Minnesota and Ph.D. in the same field from University of Wisconsin–Madison. After college, she worked in the lab as an engineer for General Mills and as an industrial trainer and self-employed engineering consultant for HB Fuller, 3M, and Ecolab, as well as teaching at the University of St. Thomas in Saint Paul, Hill-Murray School, the University of Minnesota, and as a freelance tutor.

Minnesota House of Representatives
Yarusso was first elected to the Minnesota House of Representatives in 2012 to an open seat created by post-census redistricting. She lost re-election to Republican Randy Jessup in 2016.

Electoral history

References

External links 

 Project Votesmart - Rep. Barb Yarusso Profile

1956 births
Living people
Politicians from Duluth, Minnesota
People from Shoreview, Minnesota
Democratic Party members of the Minnesota House of Representatives
Women state legislators in Minnesota
University of Minnesota faculty
University of Minnesota College of Science and Engineering alumni
University of Wisconsin–Madison College of Engineering alumni
21st-century American women politicians
People from Columbia Heights, Minnesota
American women academics
21st-century American politicians